Mitsuishi Station may refer to:
 Mitsuishi Station (Okayama), a railway station in Okayama Prefecture, Japan
 Mitsuishi Station (Kumamoto), a railway station in Kumamoto Prefecture, Japan